The 1932 Detroit Titans football team represented the University of Detroit in the 1932 college football season. Detroit outscored opponents by a combined total of 136 to 66 and finished with an 8–2 record in their eighth year under head coach and College Football Hall of Fame inductee, Gus Dorais. Significant games included victories over West Virginia (26–13) and Oregon State (14–6) and a loss to Michigan State (7–0).

Schedule

References

External links
 1932 University of Detroit football programs

Detroit
Detroit Titans football seasons
Detroit Titans football
Detroit Titans football